Brian Van't Hul is a visual effects artist. He won the Academy Award during the 78th Academy Awards for the film King Kong in the category of Best Visual Effects. He shared his win with Joe Letteri, Christian Rivers and Richard Taylor.

Van't Hul now works at Laika Studios where he helped make films like Coraline and Paranorman.

Selected filmography

King Kong (2005)
I, Robot (2004)
The Lord of the Rings: The Return of the King (2003)
Master and Commander: The Far Side of the World (2003)
The Lord of the Rings: The Two Towers (2002)
The Lord of the Rings: The Fellowship of the Ring (2001)
Forrest Gump (1994)

References

External links

Living people
Year of birth missing (living people)
Best Visual Effects Academy Award winners
Best Visual Effects BAFTA Award winners
Special effects people